Hong Jong-hak (born 12 May 1959) is an emeritus professor of economics at Gachon University previously served as President Moon Jae-in's first Minister of SMEs and Startups.

For the 2012 general election, he left Gachon University where he first started his teaching career in 1992 as a lecturer. As a parliamentarian, he took numerous roles in his party and its succeeding parties including one of its senior role, Chair of the Policy Planning Committee.

After announcing that he will not seek for re-election, he joined then-candidate Moon's presidential campaign.

He previously hosted radio show explaining economic issues at MBC Radio.

He holds three degrees in economics - a bachelor and master's from Yonsei University and a doctorate from University of California, San Diego.

Electoral history

References 

Living people
1959 births
Members of the National Assembly (South Korea)
Government ministers of South Korea
Academic staff of Gachon University
Yonsei University alumni
University of California, San Diego alumni
People from Incheon
Minjoo Party of Korea politicians